Loto are a Portuguese band from Alcobaça. The band consists of Ricardo, JT and Pedrosa, and they  produce electro-pop-rock-dance music.

Their debut was in October 2002 with the EP Swinging on a Star.

At this moment they are promoting their album "Beat Riot" that features Peter Hook, Joy Division and New Order's bass player, and Del Marquis, Scissor Sisters' guitar player.

Discography

 Swinging on a Star (EP) - 2002
 The Club (LP) - 2004
 We love you (Repackaging The Club + Remixes of "The Club") - 2005
 Beat Riot (LP) - 2006

Other projects

 2002 - CD Pop Up Songs / Optimus - "a Good Feeling"
 2003 - CD Frágil XXI - "The Boy"
 2005 - CD "Mistura Fina" - "Celebration (Celebrate Baby!)

Cinema, TV
 2007 - Corrupção O.S.T.
 2007 - Mon Cherie add
 2007 - Worten add

External links
 

Portuguese rock music groups
People from Alcobaça, Portugal